Overseas Acehnese are people of Acehnese birth or descent who live outside the province of Aceh. Acehnese community can be found most significant in Malaysia. There are also Acehnese community significantly in Scandinavia countries (Denmark, Norway and Sweden), United States, Canada, and Australia.

References

External links
World Acehnese Association

 
Indonesian diaspora